Expeditionary education is often associated with adventure education, outdoor education, environmental education, or experiential education and refers specifically to learning associated with exploration and journey-based experiences or expeditions within these fields.  Usually involving elements of challenge, adventure, and leadership, expeditionary education can take place in a variety of settings including wilderness, classrooms, and even virtual spaces (the internet).  Participants in expeditionary education can be directly involved in the expedition, or may be linked to expeditions undertaken by others.

Scope

Definitions 
Webster's online dictionary defines expeditionary as "of, relating to, or being an expedition." Expeditionary education is of, relating to, or being an expedition within an educational framework.  Expeditionary education may be mistakenly defined as a subset of or synonymous to outdoor education, adventure education, or experiential education.  While many expeditionary education programs of, or being an expedition could be defined under these existing fields (such as Outward Bound, or NOLS), educational programs relating to expeditions may take place in the classroom and not outside, requiring adventure, or experiential in nature are becoming more prevalent as explorers and expedition based researchers strive to connect educational content to their projects.

Related disciplines 
 Adventure education
 Environmental education
 Environmental studies
 Experiential education
 Outdoor education

Summary of program types 
Expeditionary education can be:
An educational expedition one participates in (Programs of or being expeditionary education).
An expedition with educational agendas of various involvement levels for non-expedition members (Programs relating to expeditions).

History 
The origins of expeditionary education could be thought to extend far back into early human history through hunting and gathering expeditions where traditional ecological knowledge was learned.  Potentially one of the first formal applications of expeditionary education were the field trips conducted through Henry David Thoreau and his brother John's Concord MA grammar school in 1838.  Later in the 19th century a summer camping movement was established in response to anxieties about urban and industrial influences on children. During this time, expeditions into "nature" were combined with informal educational pursuits.  Scouting, a movement started in 1907 by Robert Baden-Powell initiated widespread development of practical outdoor skills which often incorporated expeditionary components like camping, backpacking, and canoeing and has grown to 38 million members in 216 countries 100 years after its inception. By the late 20th century expeditions were being used as educational vehicles by many private and public sector groups and has grown into large groups such as Outward Bound, serving over 200,000 students in 2006 and National Outdoor Leadership School who have trained over 120,000 people.  Various contemporary groups and programs are discussed in #Programs

Psychology and philosophy 
Expedition as a mode of educational pursuit has its theoretical and applied roots in many soils.  Many people, theories, and practices can be identified as influential.

People 
John Dewey: Philosopher, educational reformer and proponent of experiential learning
Kurt Hahn: Founder of the Gordonstoun school and Outward Bound
John Muir: Philosopher, naturalist, conservationist, inventor writer and wilderness traveller
Paul Petzoldt: Founder of the National Outdoor Leadership School
Will Steger: Arctic Explorer and educator
Henry David Thoreau: Philosopher, naturalist, transcendentalist, tax resister, surveyor, writer
Willi Unsoeld: Facilitator of outdoor, experiential, and expeditionary education

Theories 
Experiential education theories
Group development theories
Outward bound process model
Psychoevolutionary theory and the Biophilia hypothesis
Stress, optimal arousal, comfort zone, and Flow (psychology) theories

Research 
Research has been conducted on various aspects of expeditionary education.  Correlations between a controlled exposure to challenge and psychological resiliency have been found by researchers  James Neill and Katica Dias in their study of young adult Outward Bound participants. In a review of 150 research studies conducted between 1993 and 2003, general findings of positive impacts from outdoor learning  In another meta analysis, focus areas such as self-concept, leadership, and communications skills were shown to have positive gains during the educational experience, and in contrast to many educational interventions, significant ongoing gains in follow up reviews. While these and other studies point to positive results, the difficulty of drawing causality between psychologically gained elements and these programs in empirically based studies exist in the number of variables to control for and the strength of experimental designs.

See also 

Alternative education
Education
Educational philosophies
Progressive education
Category:American environmentalists

References

Resources 
 The Outdoor Education Research and Evaluation webpage

External links 
 Ground Truth Trekking
 Expeditionary Studies at the State University of New York at Plattsburgh
 Outward Bound Expeditionary Learning Schools

Experiential learning
Outdoor education